Vladimir Stepanovich Gubarev (26 August 1938 – 25 January 2022) was a Belarusian writer, playwright, screenwriter and journalist.

Life and career 
Born in Mogilev, Gubarev started his career as a Pravda journalist, where he specialized in science-related themes, and particularly space flights. He adapted several of his reports into plays and screenplays. In 1978 he was awarded the USSR State Prize. He got international prominence thanks to his drama play Sarcophagus, based on some Pravda articles he wrote about the 1986 Chernobyl disaster. The drama was nominated at 1987 Laurence Olivier Awards for  Best New Play. Gubarev died in Moscow on 25 January 2022, at the age of 83.

References

External links
 Vladimir Gubarev at Goodreads
  

1938 births
2022 deaths
Soviet writers
Belarusian writers
Soviet journalists
Russian journalists
Science journalists
Soviet screenwriters
20th-century Russian screenwriters
Male screenwriters
20th-century Russian male writers
Communist Party of the Soviet Union members
People from Mogilev
Recipients of the USSR State Prize
Recipients of the Lenin Komsomol Prize